Matt Reeves (born April 27, 1966) is an American film director, producer, and screenwriter. He first gained recognition for the WB drama series Felicity (1998–2002), which he co-created with J. J. Abrams. Reeves came to widespread attention for directing the hit monster film Cloverfield (2008). He also directed the romantic vampire drama Let Me In (2010), and the critically acclaimed science fiction sequels Dawn of the Planet of the Apes (2014) and War for the Planet of the Apes (2017). He directed the superhero film The Batman (2022), which stars Robert Pattinson as the title character.

Early life
Reeves was born on April 27, 1966, in Rockville Centre, New York, on Long Island. He moved with his family to Los Angeles when he was five.

There he became fascinated by movies,  making them from the age of eight, directing friends and using a wind-up camera. Reeves met and befriended J. J. Abrams, who also became a filmmaker, when both were 13 years old. A Los Angeles public-access television cable channel, Z Channel, was airing their short films. When Reeves and Abrams were 15 or 16 years old, Steven Spielberg hired them to transfer some of his own Super 8 films to videotape.

Reeves attended the University of Southern California, where he was a screenwriting student for writer Jeph Loeb. Between 1991 and 1992, he produced a student film, Mr. Petrified Forest, which won an award and helped him acquire an agent. He also co-wrote a script that eventually was developed as Under Siege 2: Dark Territory. After graduating, he co-wrote Cloverfield, which he later directed.

Career
Reeves made his directorial film debut with the horror anthology film Future Shock (1994). He also directed the romantic comedy film The Pallbearer (1996), which co-starred Gwyneth Paltrow and David Schwimmer. The film was screened in Un Certain Regard section at the 1996 Cannes Film Festival.

Reeves was recognized for co-creating and showrunning the WB drama series Felicity, alongside J. J. Abrams. The series ran for 84 episodes, from 1998 to 2002. Reeves directed several episodes of the series, including the pilot. He also directed episodes of various other television series, including Relativity, Homicide: Life on the Street, and Gideon's Crossing, among others.

Reeves gained further success and international recognition for his direction of the science fiction monster film Cloverfield (2008), which Abrams produced. Reeves later served as an executive producer on 10 Cloverfield Lane (2016) and The Cloverfield Paradox (2018).

He wrote the screenplay and directed the romantic horror film Let Me In, a remake of the Swedish film Let the Right One In. The remake was released on October 1, 2010, by Overture Films.

In October 2011, Reeves signed on to direct a film based on the classic television series The Twilight Zone, but he left the project in September 2012.

Reeves directed the science fiction film Dawn of the Planet of the Apes (2014), the sequel to Rise of the Planet of the Apes, which gained both commercial and critical success. He returned to write and direct the third film in the series, War for the Planet of the Apes, which was released on July 14, 2017 to critical acclaim.

In 2014, Reeves signed a three-year production deal with 20th Century Fox. In January 2018, Reeves moved his production deal to Netflix, signing an exclusive first-look film deal with the company under his 6th & Idaho production banner.

Reeves was set to produce a film adaptation of Mouse Guard, with Wes Ball signed on to direct the film. However, the project was cancelled two weeks before production was set to begin in April 2019, due to Disney's acquisition of 20th Century Fox.

Reeves served as executive producer on the Fox science fiction thriller series The Passage, which aired for one season. He also executive produced the Amazon Prime Video science fiction drama series Tales from the Loop. The series, based on artwork by Simon Stålenhag, premiered to positive reviews in April 2020.

In July 2020, Reeves signed an exclusive, multi-year overall deal with Warner Bros. Television to develop new television programming for all of the company's platforms under his production company, 6th & Idaho. Reeves served as executive producer on the Netflix science-fiction drama series Away (2020), starring Hilary Swank.

The Batman
In February 2017, Reeves was hired to direct and produce a Batman film, titled The Batman, which would serve as part of the DC Extended Universe (DCEU). He took over the position from Ben Affleck, who initially planned to stay involved as producer and star before dropping out completely, with Reeves opting to retool the film to separate it completely from the DCEU and focus on a younger incarnation of the character, allowing him the opportunity to create a more personal story in line with his own vision and understanding of the character. Reeves co-wrote the screenplay with Peter Craig, and principal photography commenced in January 2020. Premiering in London on February 23, 2022, The Batman was released theatrically on March 4, starring Robert Pattinson as Bruce Wayne / Batman. The film is expected to serve as the first installment of a new Batman film trilogy, as well as establish a new shared universe centred on Batman; the first sequel, The Batman Part II, was announced in April 2022 with Reeves returning to write and direct, and will be released in theatres on October 3, 2025.

Upcoming projects
In August 2020, Reeves was announced to be developing a television series adapted from Diane Cook's novel The New Wilderness, in association with Warner Bros. Television.

He has been announced as producing several new works. In September 2020, Reeves was reported to  produce a live-action movie of Andy Mcdermott's first novel, The Hunt for Atlantis, a Netflix work. In March 2021, Reeves was announced as producer of an English-language remake of the Russian science fiction film Sputnik, together with Village Roadshow Pictures.

In May 2021, Reeves was confirmed to be served as an executive producer for a new Batman animated series for HBO Max and Cartoon Network, titled Batman: Caped Crusader, alongside J. J. Abrams and Bruce Timm. However in August 2022, HBO Max dropped the series, with the show being shopped to other networks; the series was ultimately picked up by Amazon Prime Video in March 2023 with a two-season order. In February 2022, Reeves was announced as producer of the vampire film Smile for Netflix, with William McGregor directing.

Reeves will also executive produce The Penguin, a limited series spin-off of The Batman for HBO Max, with Colin Farrell reprising his role as Oswald "Oz" Cobblepot/Penguin from the film. Lauren LeFranc will be showrunner.

In April 2022, it was announced Reeves would serve as producer on the heist film Lift, directed by F. Gary Gray and starring Kevin Hart, Úrsula Corberó  and Vincent D'Onofrio, for Netflix. In August 2022, Reeves signed a multi-year first-look film and television deal with Warner Bros. Pictures. In January 2023, it was announced Reeves would direct and executive produce a limited series about Buster Keaton starring Rami Malek, with Ted Cohen writing; the project is expected to be based on the biography Buster Keaton: A Filmmaker's Life by James Curtis.

Personal life
Reeves is married to Melinda Wang, a former animator. They have one son together.

Filmography

Film

As director

As writer/producer

Television

Reception

Critical response

Accolades

References

External links

 
 LAist.com Interview with Matt Reeves

1966 births
Living people
American male screenwriters
American male television writers
American soap opera writers
American television directors
Film directors from New York (state)
Film producers from New York (state)
Horror film directors
People from Rockville Centre, New York
Science fiction film directors
Screenwriters from New York (state)
Television producers from New York (state)
USC School of Cinematic Arts alumni